Bryan Mollen (born 25 September 1995) is an Irish rugby sevens player. He competed in the men's tournament at the 2020 Summer Olympics. He was part of Ireland's sevens squad at the 2022 Rugby World Cup Sevens in Cape Town.

References

External links
 

1995 births
Living people
Male rugby sevens players
Olympic rugby sevens players of Ireland
Rugby sevens players at the 2020 Summer Olympics
Place of birth missing (living people)